

368001–368100 

|-bgcolor=#f2f2f2
| colspan=4 align=center | 
|}

368101–368200 

|-bgcolor=#f2f2f2
| colspan=4 align=center | 
|}

368201–368300 

|-bgcolor=#f2f2f2
| colspan=4 align=center | 
|}

368301–368400 

|-bgcolor=#f2f2f2
| colspan=4 align=center | 
|}

368401–368500 

|-bgcolor=#f2f2f2
| colspan=4 align=center | 
|}

368501–368600 

|-id=588
| 368588 Lazrek ||  || Mohamed Lazrek (born 1958), a researcher in Cadi Ayyad University's department of physics in Marrakech. || 
|}

368601–368700 

|-id=617
| 368617 Sebastianotero ||  || Sebastian Otero (born 1973), an active amateur astronomer in Argentina. || 
|}

368701–368800 

|-id=704
| 368704 Roelgathier ||  || Roel Gathier (1953–2016) was dedicated to international space research, with outstanding communication and management skills. He played a major role in Dutch and international astronomy, as Managing Director of SRON Netherlands Institute for Space Research and as chairman of ESA's Science Programme Committee. || 
|-id=719
| 368719 Asparuh ||  || Asparuh (640–701), the founder of the Bulgarian country || 
|}

368801–368900 

|-bgcolor=#f2f2f2
| colspan=4 align=center | 
|}

368901–369000 

|-bgcolor=#f2f2f2
| colspan=4 align=center | 
|}

References 

368001-369000